Mohammed Essam (Arabic: محمد عصام; born 5 July 2000) is a Qatari footballer. He currently plays as a midfielder for Al-Arabi.

Career
Mohammed Essam started his career at Al-Arabi and is a product of the Al-Arabi's youth system. On 26 October 2018, Mohammed Essam made his professional debut for Al-Arabi against Qatar SC in the Pro League .

References

External links

2000 births
Living people
Qatari footballers
Al-Arabi SC (Qatar) players
Qatar Stars League players
Association football midfielders
Place of birth missing (living people)